Antonio dos Santos may refer to:

António Carlos dos Santos (born 1979), Brazilian footballer
Antônio Carlos dos Santos Aguiar (born 1983), Brazilian footballer
António dos Santos (bishop) (1932–2018), Portuguese Roman Catholic bishop
António dos Santos (athlete) (born 1964), Angolan Olympic athlete
António dos Santos (sport shooter) (1876–?), Portuguese sports shooter
Manuel António dos Santos (born 1943), Portuguese politician
António Augusto dos Santos, Portuguese General

See also
Antônio Carlos Santos (born 1964), Brazilian footballer
Anthony Santos, American singer
Antony Santos (born 1967), bachata musician from the Dominican Republic
Toninho dos Santos (disambiguation)